A squall is a sudden, sharp increase in wind speed.

Squall or The Squall may also refer to:

 The Squall, a 1929 film by Alexander Korda
 "Squall" (NCIS), an episode of the American television series NCIS
 "Squall" (song), a single released by Japanese band D'espairsRay
 Squall Leonhart, the main hero of the role-playing game Final Fantasy VIII
 USS Squall (PC-7), a Cyclone-class patrol ship
 "Back to Squall" a parody sketch of the film Back to School from the sketch show Tim and Eric Awesome Show: Great Job!
 Squall line, a type of thunderstorm

See also
 Skwal
VA-111 Shkval, a Soviet/Russian supercavitating torpedo